The 2018 UEFA Women's Under-17 Championship (also known as UEFA Women's Under-17 Euro 2018) was the 11th edition of the UEFA Women's Under-17 Championship, the annual international youth football championship organised by UEFA for the women's under-17 national teams of Europe. Lithuania, which were selected by UEFA on 26 January 2015, hosted the tournament from 9 to 21 May 2018.

A total of eight teams played in the tournament, with players born on or after 1 January 2001 eligible to participate. Each match had a duration of 80 minutes, consisting of two halves of 40 minutes with a 15-minute half-time.

Same as previous editions held in even-numbered years, the tournament acted as the UEFA qualifiers for the FIFA U-17 Women's World Cup. The top three teams of the tournament qualified for the 2018 FIFA U-17 Women's World Cup in Uruguay as the UEFA representatives.

Spain won their fourth title by beating defending champions Germany 2–0 in the final.

Qualification

A total of 46 UEFA nations entered the competition, and with the hosts Lithuania qualifying automatically, the other 45 teams competed in the qualifying competition to determine the remaining seven spots in the final tournament. The qualifying competition consisted of two rounds: Qualifying round, which took place in autumn 2017, and Elite round, which took place in spring 2018.

Qualified teams
The following teams qualified for the final tournament.

Final draw
The final draw was held on 6 April 2018, 10:00 EEST (UTC+3), at the Kaunas State Musical Theatre in Kaunas, Lithuania. The eight teams were drawn into two groups of four teams. There was no seeding, except that hosts Lithuania were assigned to position A1 in the draw.

Venues
In January 2015 Lithuanian Football Federation announced plans to host championships in Kaunas, Alytus, Marijampolė and Jonava, although Central stadium of Jonava had to improve the conditions in stadium. In early 2018 it was announced that competition would be held in three cities: Alytus, Marijampolė and Šiauliai.

Match officials
A total of 6 referees, 8 assistant referees and 2 fourth officials were appointed for the final tournament.

Referees
 Khristiyana Guteva
 Lucie Šulcová
 Frida Mia Klarlund Nielsen
 Irena Velevačkoska
 Désirée Grundbacher
 Kateryna Usova

Assistant referees
 Sara Telek
 Almira Spahić
 Maja Petravić
 Polyxeni Irodotou
 Élodie Coppola
 Yelena Alistratova
 Diāna Vanaga
 Sandra Österberg

Fourth officials
 Rasa Imanalijeva
 Jurgita Mačikunytė

Squads

Each national team submitted a squad of 20 players (Regulations Article 41).

Group stage
The final tournament schedule was confirmed on 12 April 2018.

The group winners and runners-up advance to the semi-finals.

Tiebreakers
In the group stage, teams are ranked according to points (3 points for a win, 1 point for a draw, 0 points for a loss), and if tied on points, the following tiebreaking criteria are applied, in the order given, to determine the rankings (Regulations Articles 17.01 and 17.02):
Points in head-to-head matches among tied teams;
Goal difference in head-to-head matches among tied teams;
Goals scored in head-to-head matches among tied teams;
If more than two teams are tied, and after applying all head-to-head criteria above, a subset of teams are still tied, all head-to-head criteria above are reapplied exclusively to this subset of teams;
Goal difference in all group matches;
Goals scored in all group matches;
Penalty shoot-out if only two teams have the same number of points, and they met in the last round of the group and are tied after applying all criteria above (not used if more than two teams have the same number of points, or if their rankings are not relevant for qualification for the next stage);
Disciplinary points (red card = 3 points, yellow card = 1 point, expulsion for two yellow cards in one match = 3 points);
UEFA coefficient for the qualifying round draw;
Drawing of lots.

All times are local, EEST (UTC+3).

Group A

Group B

Knockout stage
In the knockout stage, penalty shoot-out is used to decide the winner if necessary (no extra time is played).

Bracket

Semi-finals
Winners qualify for 2018 FIFA U-17 Women's World Cup. Losers enter the FIFA U-17 Women's World Cup play-off.

FIFA U-17 Women's World Cup play-off
Winner qualifies for 2018 FIFA U-17 Women's World Cup.

Final

Qualified teams for FIFA U-17 Women's World Cup
The following three teams from UEFA qualified for the 2018 FIFA U-17 Women's World Cup.

1 Bold indicates champions for that year. Italic indicates hosts for that year.

Goalscorers
Note: Goals scored in the FIFA U-17 Women's World Cup play-off are included in this list, but are not counted by UEFA for statistical purposes.

9 goals

 Shekiera Martinez

6 goals

 Eva Navarro

4 goals

 Ebony Salmon
 Annika Huhta (including 1 in play-off)

3 goals

 Romée Leuchter
 Kirsten van de Westeringh

2 goals

 Jess Park (including 1 in play-off)
 Aino Vuorinen
 Vanessa Fudalla
 Ivana Fuso
 Leonie Köster
 Sophie Weidauer
 Paula Arana

1 goal

 Annabel Blanchard
 Paris McKenzie
 Kaisa Juvonen
 Jenni Kantanen (in play-off)
 Vilma Koivisto
 Gia Corley
 Laura Donhauser
 Dana Foederer
 Chasity Grant
 Gwyneth Hendriks
 Nikita Tromp
 Jonna van de Velde
 Paulina Filipczak
 Paulina Tomasiak
 Aida Esteve
 Paola Hernández

1 own goal

 Kayla Rendell (playing against Germany)
 Laura Ubartaitė (playing against The Netherlands)

Team of the tournament
The UEFA technical observers selected the following 11 players for the team of the tournament (previously a squad of 18 players were selected):

Goalkeeper
 Anna Koivunen

Defenders
 Ana Tejada
 Greta Stegemann
 Nana Yang

Midfielders
 Paola Hernández
 Ivana Fuso
 Vanessa Fudalla
 Jess Park
 Kirsten van de Westeringh

Forwards
 Eva Navarro
 Shekiera Martinez

References

External links

UEFA Women's Under-17 history: 2017/18
2018 Women's U17 EURO finals: Lithuania, UEFA.com

 
2018
Women's Under-17 Championship
2018 Uefa Women's Under-17 Championship
2018 in Lithuanian football
2018 in women's association football
2018 in youth association football
May 2018 sports events in Europe